Paolo Lorenzi was the defending champion and successfully defended his title, defeating Alessandro Giannessi 6–4, 6–2 in the final.

Seeds

Draw

Finals

Top half

Bottom half

References
Main Draw
Qualifying Draw

Città di Caltanissetta - Singles
2017 Singles